Dehlaq (also known as Dehleh) is a village in Mashhad-e Miqan Rural District, in the Central District of Arak County, Markazi Province, Iran. At the 2006 census, its population was 117, in 30 families.

References 

Populated places in Arak County